Suzu Amano (born 18 February 2004) is a Japanese professional footballer who plays as a midfielder for WE League club INAC Kobe Leonessa.

Club career 
Amano made her WE League debut on 12 September 2021.

References 

Japanese women's footballers
Women's association football midfielders
Association football people from Kyoto Prefecture
INAC Kobe Leonessa players
WE League players

Living people
2004 births